phpLiteAdmin is an open-source tool written in PHP intended to handle the administration of SQLite over the World Wide Web. Its feature set, interface, and overall user experience is comparable to that of phpMyAdmin for MySQL. In the same way that SQLite is a flat file database, phpLiteAdmin is distributed in the form of a single PHP file (currently approx. 200 KiB in size). Its ease of installation, portability, and small size go hand in hand with SQLite.

Features
 Lightweight - consists of a single source file
 Supports SQLite3 with Backward compatibility for SQLite2
 Add, delete, rename, empty, and drop tables
 Browse, add, edit, and delete rows
 Add, delete, and edit fields
 Manage table indexes
 Import and export tables, fields, indexes, and rows
 Search tool to find rows based on specified field values
 Create and run custom SQL queries in the free-form query editor
 Secure password-protected interface with login screen
 Specify and manage an unlimited number of databases
 Customize the look and feel with CSS

See also

 Comparison of database tools
 SQLite
 phpMyAdmin
 PHP

References

External links
 
 Bitbucket Project

Database administration tools
Free software programmed in PHP
Cross-platform free software